Ek Chalis Ki Last Local (English: Last Local of 1:40) is a 2007 Indian Bollywood adventure comedy thriller directed by Sanjay Khanduri, starring Abhay Deol opposite Neha Dhupia in lead roles. The film released on 18 May 2007, and received positive critical response but poor commercial response upon its release.

Plot
The story revolves around two people who miss the last local train at 1:40 am at Kurla Station and how it changes the rest of their lives forever. The protagonist Nilesh works in a call centre firm cultivated by the men-centric IT Industry. Night shifts, booze, beer parties seem to occur day-by-day. When Nilesh misses his last train from Kurla to Vikhroli, he is rudely shoved off by a police constable who wants to keep the station clean from anti-social elements like him. Nowhere to go, he strolls outside for an auto-rickshaw, where he bumps into a beautiful damsel in distress, Madhu, also wanting a ride to Vikhroli. As it turns out, the rickshaws are on strike due to a bomb blast earlier in the day at Ghatkopar. Nilesh and Madhu are forced to walk to the next rickshaw stand. Nilesh stops at a local pub and is unable to resist his temptation to have a drink or two alongside Madhu. He meets an old friend, Pat, who appears to have earned a lot of money within a year through gambling. Knowing his expertise with the cards, Pat invites Nilesh to join him in the inner chambers to play with the high rollers.  Upon some persuasion from Madhu, he gives in and gambles.  Taking over Nilesh's turn, Pat loses all the money they have won to an underworld don.  In the meantime, in his search for Madhu, Nilesh stumbles into the restroom where he finds Madhu apparently being forced upon by a local goon. He accidentally kills that local goon. A police encounter specialist with two constables, a religious but notorious south Indian Don (Ponappa), a Gay underworld Don and his gang soon get involved. At last, in a twist and turn of events, all die trying to get 2.5 crore bag except Nilesh at Don's house. Starting the adventure with just Rs. 70 in his pocket, when he catches the first morning train home 2-½ hours later at 4:10 AM, he has Rs. 2.5 crores in his hands and proposes Madhu 3 days later on the same railway station and lives happily after.

Cast
 Abhay Deol as Nilesh Rastogi
 Neha Dhupia as Madhu/Mala
 Ashwin Mushran as Mr. Vinod Bajaj
 Vinay Apte as Ponnappa
 Snehal Dabi as Habiba
 Virendra Saxena as Rafique
 Atul Srivastava as Hawaldar Tawde
 Manu Rishi as Jeetiya (mangesh's hatchman) 
 Nawazuddin Siddiqui as Ponnappa's Brother (druggie in bar)
 Deepak Shirke as Mangesh Chilkey
 Murali Sharma as Saeed Sheikh Mohammad
 Ashok Samarth as Inspector Malvankar
 Amit Mistry as Patrick
 Kishor Kadam as Bhujang
 Sunita Rajwar as Chakli
 Sanatan Modi
 Bharat Ganeshpure as Policeman on Kurla station

Soundtrack
The album of Ek Chalis Ki Last Local was composed by a Pakistani rock band Call and lyrics were penned by Gulzar.

 Laree Choote 
 Laree Choote (Sachet Tandon version) 
 Laree Choote - Remix 
 Ek Chauka
 Ek Chauka (Title version)
 Akh
 Akh (Dance version)
 Bheegi Bheegi Si
 Panga

Reception

Critical reception
Martin D’Souza of GlamSham gave the movie 4.5 stars out of 5, concluding that "If you loved BHEJA FRY, you will love this flick. Don’t be late for a ride on this last local! As for the producers, the cash register has just begun jingling." Taran Adarsh of Bollywood Hungama gave the movie 4 stars out of 5, saying that "EK CHALIS KI LAST LOCAL is a decent fare that stands out for a few individualistic episodes in the narrative. At the box-office, the film caters to the multiplex audience mainly, especially big city multiplexes. Business in Mumbai multiplexes should be better due to its Mumbaiya flavor." Ashok Nayak of NowRunning gave the movie 3.5 stars out of 5, stating that "Ek Chalis Ki Last Local has shades of brilliance but 10 to 15 minutes can be easily trimmed off from the movie for better impact. Repeating and unnecessary stretching of scenes are repelling."

Sequel
A sequel titled Gyaraah Chalis Ki Last Metro was announced in the early 2010s. It was announced that the film would feature Vivek Oberoi opposite Mallika Sherawat in lead roles. In early 2012, it was announced that the idea of a sequel had been slightly changed. The project would still be released with the same cast & crew, however it will not be noted as a sequel to Ek Chalis Ki Last Local. In October 2012, the film released as Kismet Love Paisa Dilli.

References

External links
 

2007 films
Indian crime comedy films
2000s crime comedy films
Indian erotic thriller films
2000s Hindi-language films
Films set in Mumbai
Films about prostitution in India
2007 comedy films